Shirley Kaufman Daleski (June 5, 1923 in Seattle – September 25, 2016 in San Francisco) was an American-Israeli poet and translator.

Life
Her parents immigrated from Poland. She grew up in Seattle and graduated from James A. Garfield High School in 1940 and from the University of California, Los Angeles in 1944, and in 1946 she married Dr. Bernard Kaufman, Jr.  They had three daughters: Sharon (b. 1948), Joan (b. 1950) and Deborah (b. 1955). She studied at San Francisco State University with Jack Gilbert.

She married Hillel Matthew Daleski and immigrated to Jerusalem, Israel in 1973.

Her daughter, poet and playwright Debra Kaufman, made a short film about her poem "Ezekiel's Wheels".

Her work has appeared in Ploughshares, Harper's, The American Poetry Review, and The New Yorker.

She died from Alzheimer's disease at the age of 93.

Awards
 1979 NEA Fellowship
 1989 Alice Fay Di Castagnola Award of the Poetry Society of America
 1990/1991 Shelley Memorial Award

Works

Poetry
 "Cyclamen"; "The Last Threshold", Poets Against War
 "Milk", Poetry Foundation
 
 
 
 
 
  second edition, 1979
 Hebrew translation by Dan Pagis, Tel Aviv: 1980
 
 
 
 
 Me-Hayyim le-Hayyim Aherim (selected poems in Hebrew translated by Aharon Shabtai, Dan Miron and Dan Pagis). Jerusalem: 1995
 Un abri pour nostêtes (selected poems in French translated by Claude Vigée). Bilingual edition, Le Chambon-sur-Lignon, France: 2003

Translations
  2nd edition 1986
 
 Scrolls of Fire, translated from the Hebrew of Abba Kovner. Tel Aviv: 1978

Anthologies

References

External links
 "A Conversation with Shirley Kaufman", Eve Grubin, Poetry Society of America
  

1923 births
2016 deaths
Garfield High School (Seattle) alumni
Dutch–English translators
Translators to English
Israeli poets
American people of Polish-Jewish descent
American emigrants to Israel
American women poets
20th-century translators
21st-century American women